Alejandro "Kako" Sanz Sainz (born 5 June 1993) is a Spanish footballer who plays as a central midfielder.

Club career
Sanz was born in Tudela, Navarre, and represented Real Sociedad as a youth. In July 2012 he was promoted to the reserves in Segunda División B, and made his senior debut on 26 August of that year by coming on as a second-half substitute in a 0–0 away draw against Racing de Santander B.

Sanz scored his first senior goal on 9 February 2013, netting the winner in a 2–1 home defeat of CD Izarra. He subsequently became a regular starter for Sanse, being a team captain in the process.

On 16 July 2018, free agent Sanz signed a one-year deal with Segunda División side CD Numancia. He made his professional debut on 18 August, replacing Pape Maly Diamanka late into a 3–3 away draw against Córdoba CF.

On 10 June 2019, Sanz extended his contract with the Soria outfit until 2022. The following 18 January, he was loaned to CD Castellón in the third division for six months, and helped the latter side achieve promotion to the second division.

On 24 September 2020, Sanz signed for CD Atlético Baleares in division three.

On 27 January 2021, Sanz signed for Inter Turku.

References

External links

1993 births
Living people
People from Tudela, Navarre
Spanish footballers
Footballers from Navarre
Association football midfielders
Segunda División players
Segunda División B players
Real Sociedad B footballers
CD Numancia players
CD Castellón footballers
CD Atlético Baleares footballers
Veikkausliiga players
FC Inter Turku
Spanish expatriate footballers
Spanish expatriate sportspeople in Finland
Expatriate footballers in Finland